Marvin Phillip (born 1 August 1984) is a Trinidadian professional footballer who plays as a goalkeeper for the Trinidad and Tobago national team, having made his debut against Panama on 31 January 2007.

Career

Youth career
He played as a striker at schoolboy level, but retrained to become a goalkeeper before turning professional. Phillips once played a full season for his college team Presentation College San Fernando as a striker, where he top scored for his school. He has also won domestic titles as a cricketer.

Club career

Phillips has played for several domestic clubs in Trinidad and Tobago.

In 2019, he moved to India and signed with I-League side NEROCA on a season-long deal. He appeared in twelve league games as they finished the 2019–20 season on ninth position.

International career

In December 2008, Phillip's international career came into doubt after he was stabbed in the back in Hardbargain, but the goalkeeper made a full recovery and was able to play, in the absence of Clayton Ince, in World Cup qualifying matches in 2009. Phillip was called up and featured in the 2021 Gold Cup for Trinidad.

Personal life 
In May 2014, Adella Gill, the mother of his Phillip's first child, died from heart failure. In July, his 10-month-old son, Matai, also died.

References

External links 

 

1984 births
Living people
Association football goalkeepers
Trinidad and Tobago footballers
Trinidad and Tobago international footballers
TT Pro League players
San Juan Jabloteh F.C. players
Defence Force F.C. players
South Starworld Strikers F.C. players
North East Stars F.C. players
W Connection F.C. players
Joe Public F.C. players
Central F.C. players
Point Fortin Civic F.C. players
NEROCA FC players
I-League players
Morvant Caledonia United players
2013 CONCACAF Gold Cup players
2014 Caribbean Cup players
2015 CONCACAF Gold Cup players
2019 CONCACAF Gold Cup players